Darajani is a small town in the region of Eastern in central Kenya. 204 km from South-East of Nairobi, Kenya capital city.

Transport 

It is served by a station on the main line of the national railway system.

See also 

 Railway stations in Kenya

References 

Populated places in Kenya